Mireille Césarine Balin (born Blanche Mireille Césarine Balin; 20 July 1909, in Monte Carlo – 9 November 1968 in Paris) was a French-Italian actress. 

Balin was born near Monte Carlo. Her father, Charles Balin, was a French newspaper publisher. Her mother was Italian. Her education came at finishing schools. She was a policewoman in Paris until friends urged her to take a screen test.

Balin posed for some advertisements in Paris before she began acting in films. Considered one of the finest actresses of French cinema in the 1930s, she was discredited by her fraternization with the Nazis. During Nazi occupation of France, she became romantically involved with an officer of the Wehrmacht and at the end of war she was imprisoned in Fresnes until January 1945. She retired from film in 1947.

Balin arrived in Hollywood in 1937 with a staff of servants and with 28 trunks containing "most of her worldly possessions.

During the final 10 years of her life she lived in a "charitable home". Balin died in 1968, aged 59.

Filmography 

 Vive la classe (1932)
 Don Quichotte (1932)
 The Weaker Sex (1933)
 Adieu les beaux jours (1933)
 On a trouvé une femme nue (1934)
 Vive la compagnie (1934)
 Si j'étais le patron (1934)
 Marie des angoisses (1935)
 Le roman d'un spahi (1936)
 Girls of Paris  (1936)
 Pépé le Moko (1936)
 Lady Killer (1937)
 The Kiss of Fire (1937)
 Golden Venus (1938)
 Captain Benoît (1938)
 Terre de feu (1938)
 Coups de feu (1939)
 Terra di fuoco (1939)
 Cas de conscience (1939)
 Immediate Call (1939)
 The Siege of the Alcazar (1940)
 Menaces (1940)
 Macao, l'enfer du jeu  (1940)
 Fromont jeune et Risler aîné (1941)
 The Murderer is Afraid at Night (1942)
 La femme que j'ai le plus aimée (1942)
 Haut le vent (1942)
 The Trump Card (1942)
 L'assassin a peur la nuit (1942)
 Malaria (1943)
 La dernière chevauchée (1947)

References

External links

1909 births
1968 deaths
People from Monte Carlo
French film actresses
French expatriates in Monaco
20th-century French actresses